The Frances Brodie Award was created in honour of Frances Brodie, who started the first World Women's Curling Championship in 1979, and also presided over the Ladies Committee of the International Curling Federation, now known as the World Curling Federation. It is presented to the curler who best displayed skill, honesty, fair play, friendship and sportsmanship during the World Women's Curling Championships. The winner is selected by her fellow curlers in the tournament.

Winners

References

External links
 

Curling trophies and awards
Women's curling